is a mountain located in Hiranai, Aomori, Japan at the northern end of the Ōu Mountain Range.

References

Mountains of Aomori Prefecture
Hiranai, Aomori